Trichocanace is a genus of beach flies, insects in the family Canacidae. All known species are Australasian, Indomalayan, or Afrotropical.

Species
T. atra Wirth, 1964
T. marksae Wirth, 1964
T. sinensis Wirth, 1951

References

Canacidae
Carnoidea genera